In 2012 Halmstads BK will compete in Superettan and Svenska Cupen.

2012 season squad
Statistics prior to season start only

Transfers

In

Out

Appearances and goals 
As of 18 December 2012

|-
|colspan="14"|Players who have departed the club after the start of the season:

|}

Matches

Pre-season/friendlies

Superettan

Promotion/relegation play-offs 

Halmstads BK promoted 6-4 on aggregate.

Svenska Cupen

Competitions

Superettan

Standings

Results summary

Results by round

Season statistics

Superettan 

= Number of bookings
8px= Number of sending offs after a second yellow card
= Number of sending offs by a direct red card

Svenska cupen

= Number of bookings
8px= Number of sending offs after a second yellow card
= Number of sending offs by a direct red card

International players
Does only contain players that represent the senior squad during the 2012 season.

Senior

U21

Youth

References
Footnotes

References

External links
 Halmstads BK homepage
 SvFF homepage

Halmstads BK seasons
Halmstad